Mel and Khaonh constitute a Bahnaric language of northeastern Cambodia. 

Kraol, Thmon, Khaonh, and Mel all have about 70% lexical similarity with Stieng, a Southern Bahnaric language (Barr & Pawley 2013:32).

Mel is spoken in the following villages of Kratié Province, Cambodia (Barr & Pawley 2013).
Srae Tahaen, Sambok commune, Kratié District
Ou Krieng, Ou Krieng Commune, Sambour District

Khaonh is spoken in the following villages of Kratié Province, Cambodia (Barr & Pawley 2013).
Chhok, Thmei commune, Kratié District
Khnach, Thmei commune, Kratié District
Kosang, Changkrang commune, Kratié District

References

Sources
Barr, Julie and Eric Pawley. 2013. Bahnaric Language Cluster survey of Mondul Kiri and Kratie Provinces, Cambodia. SIL International.

Bahnaric languages
Languages of Cambodia